The knockout stages of the 2016 Copa do Brasil was played from August 24 to November 26, 2014. A total of 16 teams competed in the knockout stages.

A draw by CBF was held on August 2 to set the matches for this round. The 16 qualified teams were divided in two pots. Teams from pot 1 are the ones who competed at the 2016 Copa Libertadores and the best placed team in the 2015 Brazilian Série A not taking part in the 2016 Copa Libertadores plus the two highest CBF ranked teams qualified via the Third Round. Pot 2 is composed of the other teams that qualified through the Third Round. Each pot was divided into 4 pairs according to the CBF ranking. That division makes sure that each team within a pair will not face each other before the finals as they will be placed in opposite sides of the bracket. There was a draw to decide the home team of the round of 16. The following stages will have other draws to determine the order of the matches as the tournament advances.

Seeding
2016 CBF ranking shown in brackets.

Bracket

Round of 16
The first legs was played on August 24 – September 1 and the second legs was played on September 21–22, 2016.

|}

Match 71

Tied 2–2 on aggregate, Juventude won on away goals.

Match 72

Corinthians won 2–1 on aggregate.

Match 73

Santos won 5–3 on aggregate.

Match 74

Palmeiras won 3–1 on aggregate.

Match 75

Tied 1–1 on aggregate, Grêmio won on penalties.

Match 76

Internacional won 3–1 on aggregate.

Match 77

Cruzeiro won 6–2 on aggregate.

Match 78

Tied 3–3 on aggregate, Atlético Mineiro won on away goals.

Quarterfinals
The first leg was played on September 28 and the second leg was played on October 19, 2016.

|}

Match 79

Tied 1–1 on aggregate, Atlético Mineiro won on penalties.

Match 80

Internacional won 3–2 on aggregate.

Match 81

Grêmio won 3–2 on aggregate.

Match 82

Cruzeiro won 5–4 on aggregate.

Semifinals
The first leg was played on October 26 and the second leg was played on November 2, 2016.

|}

Match 83

Atlético Mineiro won 4–3 on aggregate.

Match 84

Grêmio won 2–0 on aggregate.

Finals
The first leg will be played on November 23 and the second leg will be played on November 30, 2016.

|}

Match 85

Match 86

Grêmio won 4–2 on aggregate.

Notes

References

knockout stages